(), also , , , is a variety of , or overcoat, in , the Korean traditional garment.

History
The origin of  traces back to at least the Three Kingdoms of Korea, where it originated from a long coat worn by the northern nomadic people to fend off cold weather in ancient times.Korean historical academia considers that the origins of the durumagi can be traced back to the Goguryeo period.

The tomb murals from Goguryeo were primarily painted in two regions, Ji'an and Pyeongyang, which are the second and third capitals of the Goguryeo from the middle of the 4th to the middle of the 7th centuries respectively. The paintings datings from this period in the region of Jian typically shows the characteristics of the people of Goguryeo in terms of morals and customs while those in the regions of Pyeongyang would typically the cultural influence of the Han dynasty, including figures dressed in Chinese-style attire, as the Han dynasty had governed this geographical region for approximately 400 years. 
Yet Chinese-style clothes were limited to the Royal and Aristocratic attires, and It is considered that They wore Korean-style attires in normal times.

The  murals show a mixture of elements from before and after the fifth century; the wide-sleeves attire also reflect the characteristics of tomb murals which are found near the Pyeongyang area. The ancient  was also worn with a waist belt and had wide sleeves.

Goryeo 

 Joseon period 
In 1884, King Gojong promulgated the unification of clothing for all social classes through reform laws. However, this law was met with much resistance and it was only until ten years later, after the Gabo Reform of 1894, that the  became common as formal attire.

 Construction and design 
The  is an overcoat, which is closed all around, lacking side and back vents. It has a straight collar with front overlapping front panels closing to the right, side gores, chest ties, neckband and narrow sleeves; its length is about under the calves and above the ankles. 

Different fabrics and materials are used in making : calico, wool, cotton, and various silks for winter; ramie, fine ramie and silk gauze for summer; various silks and calico for spring and autumn. White, grey and navy blue are commonly used.

 Types of  

During the Goryeo-era, a unique type of armor, called Durumagi emerged as the main armor for the Korean armies up until the early Joseon period in the 15th century. The opponents of Goryeo weren't heavily armored soldiers of other Koreanic states anymore. The trend shifted towards armor that made units mobile and responsive to a conflict with nomadic Mongolic or semi-nomadic and sedentary Tungusic tribes to the North. The Durumagi is a simple overcoat or robe with scale armor inside forming dots on the outside. Commonly these scales are made from leather, or iron, but some of them are shaped like leaves or coated with mercury or black lacquer to make them shine. They're also complete with a (winged) helmet with or without a hohaeg (()()) of lamellar inside to protect their heads and necks.

 Modern use 

The  is still considered an important part of traditional attire for formal occasions, but a variety of colours and designs are being used. Colourful '' were given as gifts to the world leaders of the 2005 APEC Summit in Busan.

See also
Dopo
Gonryongpo
Hanbok
Jeonbok
Kkachi durumagi
Po
Sagyusam

References

External links

 Owner of  tomb wearing a purple (or red)  from the National Museum of Korea
 Korea National Heritage online from the Cultural Heritage Administration
  Hanbok Story

Korean clothing
Jackets